'Sambil Paraguaná Ciudad Turistica' is a shopping mall and an urban development in Paraguaná. It contains a hotel, a movie theatre, and a supermarket. It is located at Falcón, Punto Fijo on Paraguaná Peninsula which is a duty-free zone,

See also 
 Centro Sambil
 List of shopping malls in Venezuela
 List of largest shopping malls as comparison.

References

External links 
 

Shopping malls in Venezuela